The Abdel Kuri rock gecko (Pristurus abdelkuri) is a species of lizard in the Sphaerodactylidae family found on Abd al Kuri.

References

Pristurus
Reptiles described in 1986